Diandromyces is a genus of fungi in the family Laboulbeniaceae. A monotypic genus, Diandromyces contains the single species Diandromyces chilenus.

References

External links
Diandromyces at Index Fungorum

Laboulbeniomycetes
Monotypic Laboulbeniomycetes genera